Joseph Aloysius Goulden (August 1, 1844 – May 3, 1915) was an American educator, businessman, Civil War veteran, and politician who served five terms as a U.S. Representative from New York from 1903 to 1911, and from 1913 to 1915.

Biography
Born on August 1, 1844, in Littlestown, Pennsylvania, he attended the schools of Gettysburg, Pennsylvania and Taneytown, Maryland, graduated from Eagleton Institute in Taneytown, and received his certification as a teacher when he was 18. Goulden was present when Abraham Lincoln delivered the Gettysburg Address, and heard the speech in person.

Civil War 
Goulden served during the American Civil War as a member of the United States Marine Corps.  He enlisted in 1864, was discharged in 1866, and attained the rank of sergeant. He was a member of the Marine detachment aboard the USS Don, and saw combat in battles including Drewry's Bluff, where the ship he was on received fire from the shore and he was wounded.

Business career 
After the war Goulden was a teacher and principal at public and parochial schools in Emmitsburg, Maryland and Martinsburg, West Virginia, and served as a member of the board of managers of Pennsylvania's state reformatory in Morganza, Pennsylvania. In 1870 he relocated to Pittsburgh, Pennsylvania, where he established himself in the insurance business as a manager for Penn Mutual Life Insurance. From 1882 to 1886 he served on the military staff of Governor Robert E. Pattison with the rank of colonel.

In 1889 Goulden moved to New York City, where he pursued business investments in addition to remaining active in insurance. Among his ventures was the Chelan Consolidated Copper Company, of which he was president.  He was also the principal of an insurance agency, J. A. Goulden & Son.

Goulden later moved to The Bronx. He was active in several veterans' and civic causes, including the Atlantic Deeper Waterways Association. and the state and city school systems and the College of the City of New York.  He was a member of the Grand Army of the Republic, a member of the board of trustees of the Bath, New York soldiers' home, and secretary of the commission that erected the Soldiers' and Sailors' Monument on Riverside Drive.

Recreation 
Goulden also spent summers and holidays at Glenburn, a country home in Taneytown which had been in his family for several generations.

Political career
Goulden was active politics as a Democrat and was identified with Tammany Hall. In 1902 he was elected to the 58th Congress. He was reelected to the three succeeding Congresses and served from March 4, 1903, to March 3, 1911. He declined to be a candidate for reelection in 1910.

In 1912 Goulden was elected to the 63rd Congress. He was reelected to the 64th Congress in 1914, and served from March 4, 1913, until his death.

Death and burial
He died in Philadelphia, Pennsylvania on May 3, 1915, expiring at Broad Street Station while in town to attend a meeting of the Penn Mutual Insurance Board of Trustees, of which he was a member. He was interred in St. Joseph's Cemetery in Taneytown.

See also
List of United States Congress members who died in office (1900–49)

References

External resources

Joseph A. Goulden, Late a Representative from New York.  US Government Printing Office (Washington, DC).  1917.

1844 births
1915 deaths
People from Littlestown, Pennsylvania
Politicians from New York City
People from Taneytown, Maryland
American businesspeople in insurance
People of Pennsylvania in the American Civil War
United States Marines
American militia officers
Democratic Party members of the United States House of Representatives from New York (state)
19th-century American politicians
Union Marines
19th-century American businesspeople